Seaborn Jones (February 1, 1788 – March 18, 1864) was a United States representative from Georgia. Born in Augusta, Georgia, he attended Princeton College and studied law. By a special act of the legislature, he was admitted to the bar in 1808. He commenced a legal practice in Milledgeville.

Jones was appointed Solicitor General of the Ocmulgee circuit in September 1817, and was Solicitor General of Georgia in 1823. He was one of the commissioners appointed to investigate the disturbances in the Creek Nation; in 1827 he moved to Columbus, Georgia where he built his home El Dorado, later renamed St. Elmo. Jones was elected as a Jacksonian to the Twenty-third Congress, serving from March 4, 1833, to March 3, 1835. He was elected as a Democrat to the Twenty-ninth Congress, serving from March 4, 1845, to March 3, 1847. He died in Columbus, and was buried was at Linwood Cemetery.

Jones' daughter, Mary Howard Jones, married Henry L. Benning, for whom Fort Benning is named. In 2002, the Seaborn Jones Memorial Park in Rockmart, Georgia was named after Jones.

References

1788 births
1864 deaths
Politicians from Augusta, Georgia
American people of Welsh descent
Princeton University alumni
Jacksonian members of the United States House of Representatives from Georgia (U.S. state)
Democratic Party members of the United States House of Representatives from Georgia (U.S. state)
American slave owners
19th-century American politicians